"Get It Shawty" is a song by American R&B artist Lloyd. It was released in March 2007 as the second single from his second album, Street Love (2007). Lloyd stated that he wanted to try something different with the track, to have fun and show some of his dance moves. The track was produced by James "J. Lack" Lackey, the younger brother of R&B singer Usher. Lloyd overheard the beat when he was at Usher's manager's office, and liked it so much that he begged Usher to let him have it for a song. In addition to hip-hop remixes, Moto Blanco provided the official dance mix for the song. The single debuted on Billboard's Hot R&B/Hip-Hop Songs chart at number fifty-seven on the issue dated March 24, 2007, and it peaked at number four. The following week the single debuted on the Billboard Hot 100 at number seventy-six and it peaked at number sixteen. The song was featured in the in-game radio station The Vibe 98.8 in Grand Theft Auto IV.

Music video
The music video premiered on BET's Access Granted on February 28, 2007. Three remixes have been released, one featuring Yung Joc, another featuring Joe Budden, and another featuring Lil Wayne, Big Boi, and Chamillionaire.

Remixes
"Get It Shawty" (Remix) featuring Yung Joc
"Get It Shawty" (Official Remix) featuring Lil Wayne, Big Boi and Chamillionaire
"Get It Shawty" (NY Remix) featuring Ja Rule, Joe Budden and Jim Jones
"Get It Shawty" (Remix Part I) featuring Missy Elliott and Yung Joc
"Get It Shawty" (Remix Part II) featuring Joe Budden, Missy Elliott and Yung Joc
"Get It Shawty" (Murda Remix) featuring Ja Rule and Big Boi
"Get It Shawty" (Remix) featuring Nina Sky and Yung Joc
"Get It Shawty" (Remix) featuring Joe Budden
"Get It Shawty" (Remix) featuring Jim Jones
"Get It Shawty" (Remix) featuring Drake
"Get It Shawty" (Remix) featuring Cory Bold
"Get It Shawty" (Remix) featuring Gryffin
"Get It Shawty" (Moto Blanco Radio Mix)
"Get It Shawty" (Moto Blanco Vocal Mix)
"Get It Shawty" (Moto Blanco Dub)
"Get It Shawty" (Instrumental)
"Get It Shawty" (A Cappella)

Charts

Weekly charts

Year-end charts

References

2006 songs
2007 singles
Lloyd (singer) songs
Universal Music Group singles